The following is a glossary of figure skating terms, sorted alphabetically.

0–9

A

B

C

D

E

F

G

H

I

J

K

L

M

N

O

P

Q

R

S

T

U

W

Y

Z

References

External links 
 Glossary of Terms at U.S. Figure Skating
 International Skating Union

Figure skating

Figure skating
Figure skating-related lists
Wikipedia glossaries using description lists